Are You the One? (often abbreviated as AYTO?) is an American reality television series featuring a group of men and women are secretly paired into couples via a matchmaking algorithm. While living together, the contestants try to identify all of these "perfect matches." If they succeed, the entire group shares a prize of up to $1 million. All couples in the first seven seasons were male-female, while in the eighth season a contestant's match could be someone of any gender.

Over the course of each season, the contestants go on dates with partners determined by competitions (or, in the seventh season only, by the "fate button"), and have the opportunity to learn in the "truth booth" if a given couple is a correct match. Once the truth booth confirms a perfect match, that couple will go to the honeymoon suite and will automatically be paired up for the remainder of the match ceremonies. At the end of each episode, the contestants pair up in a "matching ceremony" and learn how many perfect matches they have, but not which matches are correct. From season 3 onward, the prize was reduced any time that the house failed to identify any matches other than those already confirmed via the truth booth.

On June 26, 2019, the eighth season began broadcasting on MTV. This series was marked as the first to exclusively feature openly LGBT and sexually fluid contestants, a decision that was met with critical acclaim.

On March 3, 2022, it was announced that the show would be revived as an international version by Paramount+. On December 8, 2022, it was announced that Kamie Crawford would be the new host, and that the ninth season would premiere on January 18, 2023.

Series overview

Season 1

Filmed in Kauai, Hawaii and premiered on January 21, 2014. It featured 20 contestants looking for love in a chance to win a one million dollar prize to split.

Season 2

Filmed in San Juan, Puerto Rico and premiered on October 6, 2014. This time, one guy has two matches which means that there will be eleven girls, but only ten boys. Christina is revealed as the first girl of the threeway couple. It is a race between Christina and another girl to find her perfect match and be confirmed as such in the Truth-Booth. The first couple of the threeway-couple to do so will end up in the honeymoon-suite. The other girl will have to leave empty-handed. However this only applied if one of those two matches were confirmed in the Truth Booth. If neither Christina nor the other girl get sent home, and the group wins the money by getting 10 matches at the matchup ceremony, then all 21 contestants will win money.

Season 3

Filmed in Kona, Hawaii. Season three premiered on September 24, 2015. This season had a rule change, if there is a "black out" at a matchup ceremony (meaning no beams of light other than already-confirmed matches) then the house gets $250,000 deducted from their prize.

Season 4

Filmed in Maui, Hawaii. Season four premiered on June 13, 2016.

Season 5

Filmed in Cabarete, Dominican Republic. Season five premiered on January 11, 2017. This season featured 2 big changes. When a couple gets sent into the truth booth to see if they are a perfect match, the rest of the house can either vote to see if they are a perfect match, or earn $150,000, and not see the result of the couple. This only will pertain to certain weeks. Also, if the house blacks out at a match-up ceremony, their money will decrease by 50% each time instead of $250,000.

Season 6

Filmed in New Orleans, Louisiana. Season six premiered on September 20, 2017.

Season 7

Filmed in Kona, Hawaii, Hokukano Bayhouse. Season seven premiered on August 15, 2018. This season featured a change in the rules to get a date, the contestants no longer had to compete against each other to win a date. Instead, Terrance would choose two people, one guy and one girl, to come up and press a button stopping a scrolling wheel of faces at random of the opposite sex. Two guys and two girls would be chosen at random to go on a four-person date to couple off as they choose. Everyone back at the house then voted whichever couple they thought most likely to be a 'Perfect Match' into the Truth Booth.

Season 8

Filmed in Kona, Hawaii. Season eight premiered on June 26, 2019. For the first time on Are You the One?, all cast members were bisexual, with no gender limitations on their potential perfect matches. This season received a GLAAD Media Award for Outstanding Reality Program in 2020.

Season 9

Filmed in Gran Canaria, Spain. Season nine premiered on January 18, 2023. For the first time in the shows history, the whole cast found their perfect matches in only nine weeks, instead of the normal ten weeks.

Are You the One? Second Chances
On March 22, 2017, spin-off Are You The One: Second Chances premiered. The series, filmed in Melbourne, Australia and hosted by Karamo Brown, featured ten perfect matches from previous seasons returning to compete in tasks designed to test the strength of their bonds. Each week, teams could add to their potential winnings, but individual contestants had the opportunity to take their team's winnings from their partner and remove their team from the game.

Cast

Elimination progress

Competition
 The team won the final challenge
 The team received 2nd place in the final challenge
 The team received 3rd place in the final challenge
 The team won the mission and was safe from elimination
 The team was voted into The Choice and decided to 'Share' their money, therefore remaining in the game
 The team received last place and was eliminated
 The team did not receive last place but one team member stole the money and their team was eliminated
 The team received last place but remained in the game due to another contestant, who got voted into The Choice, stole all of the money
 The team was voted into The Choice, but was saved due to it being a non-elimination episode and it was not revealed if they decided to 'Share' or 'Steal' the money
 The team received last place but was saved due to it being a non-elimination episode

Bank Accounts

Competition
 The team won the final challenge and shared the money.
 The team received 2nd place in the final challenge. 
 The team received 3rd place in the final challenge. 
 The team won the mission and was safe from elimination.
 The team was voted into The Choice and decided to 'Share' their money, therefore remaining in the game.
 The team received last place and was eliminated.
 The team received last place but remained in the game due to another contestant, who got voted into The Choice, stealing the money from their partner, and remained in the game.
 The contestant was voted into The Choice and decided to 'Steal' the money, but their teammate decided to 'Share' the money and they were eliminated with all of the money.
 The contestant was voted into The Choice and decided to 'Share' the money, but their teammate decided to 'Steal' the money and they were eliminated with no money.
 The contestant was voted into The Choice and was saved due to it being a non-elimination episode. Their choice was not revealed if they Shared or Stole the money.
 The contestant received last place but was saved due to it being a non-elimination episode.

Notes

International versions

References

External links
 
 

2010s American reality television series
2014 American television series debuts
2019 American television series endings
2020s American reality television series
2023 American television series debuts
American dating and relationship reality television series
American television series revived after cancellation
Are You the One?
English-language television shows
GLAAD Media Award-winning shows
MTV reality television series
Paramount+ original programming
Television shows filmed in Australia
Television shows filmed in Hawaii
Television shows filmed in New Orleans
Television shows filmed in Puerto Rico
Television shows filmed in the Dominican Republic